This is a list of Private Passions episodes from 2000 to 2004. It does not include repeated episodes or compilations.

2000

2001

2002

2003

2004

References

External links

Lists of British radio series episodes